ED TV or Ed TV may refer to
EDtv, a 1999 American comedy film directed by Ron Howard
Ed (TV series), an NBC comedy/drama starring Tom Cavanagh
The Ed Show, an MSNBC show hosted by Ed Schultz
Enhanced-definition television, American shorthand for certain digital television (DTV) formats and devices
Dubai TV, United Arab Emirates channel formerly known as Emirates Dubai Television